Of Love and Shadows is a novel written by Chilean novelist Isabel Allende in 1984. The plotline was inspired by journalistic accounts taken from magazines, newspapers, and interviews that Allende herself gathered both working as a journalist in Chile before her exile and during her later career as a writer in Venezuela.

Plot    
Irene is a magazine editor living under the shadow of the Pinochet dictatorship in Chile. Francisco is a handsome photographer and he comes to Irene for a job. As a sympathizer with the underground resistance movement, Francisco opens her eyes and her heart to the atrocities being committed by the state. Irene and Francisco begin a passionate affair, ready to risk everything for the sake of justice and truth.

Film
In 1994, this novel was adapted into a film starring Antonio Banderas and Jennifer Connelly.

References

Joseph,Maria. "Of Love and Shadows Text Guide." Insight Publications, Melbourne, 2006. 

1984 Chilean novels
Novels by Isabel Allende
Chilean novels adapted into films